The 1976 Washington State Cougars baseball team represented the Washington State University in the 1976 NCAA Division I baseball season. The Cougars played their home games at Bailey Field. The team was coached by Chuck Brayton in his 14th year as head coach at Washington State.

The Cougars won the West Regional to advance to the College World Series, where they were defeated by the Maine Black Bears.

Roster

Schedule

|-
! style="" | Regular Season
|-

|-
! bgcolor="#DDDDFF" width="3%" | #
! bgcolor="#DDDDFF" width="7%" | Date
! bgcolor="#DDDDFF" width="14%" | Opponent
! bgcolor="#DDDDFF" width="25%" | Site/Stadium
! bgcolor="#DDDDFF" width="5%" | Score
! bgcolor="#DDDDFF" width="5%" | Overall Record
! bgcolor="#DDDDFF" width="5%" | Pac8 Record
|- align="center" bgcolor="#ffcccc"
| 1 || March 13 || at  || Harris Field • Lewiston, Idaho || 0–2 || 0–1 || 0–0
|- align="center" bgcolor="#ffcccc"
| 2 || March 13 || at Lewis–Clark State || Harris Field • Lewiston, Idaho || 0–4 || 0–2 || 0–0
|- align="center" bgcolor="#ccffcc"
| 3 || March 14 || vs  || Harris Field • Lewiston, Idaho || 2–0 || 1–2 || 0–0
|- align="center" bgcolor="#ccffcc"
| 4 || March 14 || vs Idaho || Harris Field • Lewiston, Idaho || 4–0 || 2–2 || 0–0
|- align="center" bgcolor="#ccffcc"
| 5 || March 19 || vs  || Harris Field • Lewiston, Idaho || 16–0 || 3–2 || 0–0
|- align="center" bgcolor="#ffcccc"
| 6 || March 19 || vs  || Harris Field • Lewiston, Idaho || 4–9 || 3–3 || 0–0
|- align="center" bgcolor="#ccffcc"
| 7 || March 20 || vs  || Harris Field • Lewiston, Idaho || 9–2 || 4–3 || 0–0
|- align="center" bgcolor="#ccffcc"
| 8 || March 20 || vs  || Harris Field • Lewiston, Idaho || 4–2 || 5–3 || 0–0
|- align="center" bgcolor="#ccffcc"
| 9 || March 21 || vs  || Harris Field • Lewiston, Idaho || 6–0 || 6–3 || 0–0
|- align="center" bgcolor="#ccffcc"
| 10 || March 22 ||  || Bailey Field • Pullman, Washington || 7–0 || 7–3 || 0–0
|- align="center" bgcolor="#ccffcc"
| 11 || March 22 || Eastern Oregon || Bailey Field • Pullman, Washington || 9–3 || 8–3 || 0–0
|- align="center" bgcolor="#ccffcc"
| 12 || March 26 || at Boise State || Unknown • Boise, Idaho || 14–5 || 9–3 || 0–0
|- align="center" bgcolor="#ccffcc"
| 13 || March 27 || vs  || Unknown • Boise, Idaho || 9–1 || 10–3 || 0–0
|- align="center" bgcolor="#ccffcc"
| 14 || March 31 || vs Gonzaga || Unknown • Boise, Idaho || 12–6 || 11–3 || 0–0
|-

|-
! bgcolor="#DDDDFF" width="3%" | #
! bgcolor="#DDDDFF" width="7%" | Date
! bgcolor="#DDDDFF" width="14%" | Opponent
! bgcolor="#DDDDFF" width="25%" | Site/Stadium
! bgcolor="#DDDDFF" width="5%" | Score
! bgcolor="#DDDDFF" width="5%" | Overall Record
! bgcolor="#DDDDFF" width="5%" | Pac8 Record
|- align="center" bgcolor="#ffcccc"
| 15 || April 1 || at Arizona State || Packard Stadium • Tempe, Arizona || 3–13 || 11–4 || 0–0
|- align="center" bgcolor="#ffcccc"
| 16 || April 2 || vs  || Packard Stadium • Tempe, Arizona || 0–2 || 11–5 || 0–0
|- align="center" bgcolor="#ccffcc"
| 17 || April 4 || vs  || Packard Stadium • Tempe, Arizona || 5–2 || 12–5 || 0–0
|- align="center" bgcolor="#ffcccc"
| 18 || April 5 || vs  || Packard Stadium • Tempe, Arizona || 2–11 || 12–6 || 0–0
|- align="center" bgcolor="#ccffcc"
| 19 || April 6 || at  || Unknown • Provo, Utah || 3–2 || 13–6 || 0–0
|- align="center" bgcolor="#ccffcc"
| 20 || April 7 || vs Boise State || Unknown • Provo, Utah || 8–4 || 14–6 || 0–0
|- align="center" bgcolor="#ffcccc"
| 21 || April 7 || vs Boise State || Unknown • Provo, Utah || 3–8 || 14–7 || 0–0
|- align="center" bgcolor="#ccffcc"
| 22 || April 8 || at Northwest Nazarene || Unknown • Nampa, Idaho || 7–6 || 15–7 || 0–0
|- align="center" bgcolor="#ccffcc"
| 23 || April 10 || at  || Unknown • Cheney, Washington || 22–2 || 16–7 || 0–0
|- align="center" bgcolor="#ccffcc"
| 24 || April 10 || at Eastern Washington || Unknown • Cheney, Washington || 13–5 || 17–7 || 0–0
|- align="center" bgcolor="#ffcccc"
| 25 || April 14 || at Gonzaga || Unknown • Spokane, Washington || 4–5 || 17–8 || 0–0
|- align="center" bgcolor="#ccffcc"
| 26 || April 15 || at  || Guy Wicks Field • Moscow, Idaho || 18–2 || 18–8 || 0–0
|- align="center" bgcolor="#ccffcc"
| 27 || April 16 ||  || Bailey Field • Pullman, Washington || 4–1 || 19–8 || 1–0
|- align="center" bgcolor="#ccffcc"
| 28 || April 17 || Oregon || Bailey Field • Pullman, Washington || 5–1 || 20–8 || 2–0
|- align="center" bgcolor="#ccffcc"
| 29 || April 17 || Oregon || Bailey Field • Pullman, Washington || 8–4 || 21–8 || 3–0
|- align="center" bgcolor="#ccffcc"
| 30 || April 18 ||  || Bailey Field • Pullman, Washington || 11–0 || 22–8 || 3–0
|- align="center" bgcolor="#ffcccc"
| 31 || April 24 || at  || Coleman Field • Corvallis, Oregon || 0–4 || 22–9 || 3–1
|- align="center" bgcolor="#ffcccc"
| 32 || April 24 || at Oregon State || Coleman Field • Corvallis, Oregon || 1–2 || 22–10 || 3–2
|- align="center" bgcolor="#ccffcc"
| 33 || April 25 || at Oregon State || Coleman Field • Corvallis, Oregon || 12–2 || 23–10 || 4–2
|- align="center" bgcolor="#ccffcc"
| 34 || April 26 || Idaho || Bailey Field • Pullman, Washington || 12–1 || 24–10 || 4–2
|- align="center" bgcolor="#ffcccc"
| 35 || April 27 || Gonzaga || Bailey Field • Pullman, Washington || 1–4 || 24–11 || 4–2
|- align="center" bgcolor="#ccffcc"
| 36 || April 30 || at  || Graves Field • Seattle, Washington || 9–1 || 25–11 || 5–2
|-

|-
! bgcolor="#DDDDFF" width="3%" | #
! bgcolor="#DDDDFF" width="7%" | Date
! bgcolor="#DDDDFF" width="14%" | Opponent
! bgcolor="#DDDDFF" width="25%" | Site/Stadium
! bgcolor="#DDDDFF" width="5%" | Score
! bgcolor="#DDDDFF" width="5%" | Overall Record
! bgcolor="#DDDDFF" width="5%" | Pac8 Record
|- align="center" bgcolor="#ccffcc"
| 37 || May 1 || at Washington || Graves Field • Seattle, Washington || 11–5 || 26–11 || 6–2
|- align="center" bgcolor="#ccffcc"
| 38 || May 1 || at Washington || Graves Field • Seattle, Washington || 9–0 || 27–11 || 7–2
|- align="center" bgcolor="#ffcccc"
| 39 || May 4 || Eastern Washington || Bailey Field • Pullman, Washington || 5–8 || 27–12 || 7–2
|- align="center" bgcolor="#ccffcc"
| 40 || May 7 || Oregon State || Bailey Field • Pullman, Washington || 1–0 || 28–12 || 8–2
|- align="center" bgcolor="#ccffcc"
| 41 || May 8 || Oregon State || Bailey Field • Pullman, Washington || 13–3 || 29–12 || 9–2
|- align="center" bgcolor="#ccffcc"
| 42 || May 8 || Oregon State || Bailey Field • Pullman, Washington || 3–2 || 30–12 || 10–2
|- align="center" bgcolor="#ccffcc"
| 43 || May 14 || at Oregon || Howe Field • Eugene, Oregon || 13–8 || 31–12 || 11–2
|- align="center" bgcolor="#ccffcc"
| 44 || May 15 || at Oregon || Howe Field • Eugene, Oregon || 7–2 || 32–12 || 12–2
|- align="center" bgcolor="#ccffcc"
| 45 || May 15 || at Oregon || Howe Field • Eugene, Oregon || 10–5 || 33–12 || 13–2
|- align="center" bgcolor="#ccffcc"
| 46 || May 20 || Lewis–Clark State || Bailey Field • Pullman, Washington || 13–2 || 34–12 || 13–2
|- align="center" bgcolor="#ccffcc"
| 47 || May 21 || Washington || Bailey Field • Pullman, Washington || 18–3 || 35–12 || 14–2
|- align="center" bgcolor="#ccffcc"
| 48 || May 22 || Washington || Bailey Field • Pullman, Washington || 13–3 || 36–12 || 15–2
|- align="center" bgcolor="#ccffcc"
| 49 || May 22 || Washington || Bailey Field • Pullman, Washington || 19–3 || 37–12 || 16–2
|-

|-
! style="" | Postseason
|-

|-
! bgcolor="#DDDDFF" width="3%" | #
! bgcolor="#DDDDFF" width="7%" | Date
! bgcolor="#DDDDFF" width="14%" | Opponent
! bgcolor="#DDDDFF" width="25%" | Site/Stadium
! bgcolor="#DDDDFF" width="5%" | Score
! bgcolor="#DDDDFF" width="5%" | Overall Record
! bgcolor="#DDDDFF" width="5%" | Pac8 Record
|- align="center" bgcolor="#ccffcc"
| 50 || May 28 || vs  || Bailey Field • Pullman, Washington || 8–2 || 38–12 || 16–2
|- align="center" bgcolor="#ccffcc"
| 51 || May 29 || vs  || Bailey Field • Pullman, Washington || 5–1 || 39–12 || 16–2
|- align="center" bgcolor="#ffcccc"
| 52 || June 2 || vs Cal State Fullerton || Bailey Field • Pullman, Washington || 1–13 || 39–13 || 16–2
|- align="center" bgcolor="#ccffcc"
| 53 || June 2 || vs Cal State Fullerton || Bailey Field • Pullman, Washington || 7–2 || 40–13 || 16–2
|-

|-
! bgcolor="#DDDDFF" width="3%" | #
! bgcolor="#DDDDFF" width="7%" | Date
! bgcolor="#DDDDFF" width="14%" | Opponent
! bgcolor="#DDDDFF" width="25%" | Site/Stadium
! bgcolor="#DDDDFF" width="5%" | Score
! bgcolor="#DDDDFF" width="5%" | Overall Record
! bgcolor="#DDDDFF" width="5%" | Pac8 Record
|- align="center" bgcolor="#ccffcc"
| 54 || June 12 || vs  || Johnny Rosenblatt Stadium • Omaha, Nebraska || 6–1 || 41–13 || 16–2
|- align="center" bgcolor="#ffcccc"
| 55 || June 13 || vs Arizona State || Johnny Rosenblatt Stadium • Omaha, Nebraska || 3–9 || 41–14 || 16–2
|- align="center" bgcolor="#ffcccc"
| 56 || June 14 || vs  || Johnny Rosenblatt Stadium • Omaha, Nebraska || 3–6 || 41–15 || 16–2
|-

|-
|

Awards and honors 
Greg Herrick
First Team All-Pacific-8 Conference

Mike Hutlman
First Team All-Pacific-8 Conference

Marty Maxwell
First Team All-Pacific-8 Conference

Tim Tveit
First Team All-Pacific-8 Conference

Phil Westendorf
First Team All-Pacific-8 Conference

Eric Wilkins
First Team All-Pacific-8 Conference

References

Washington State Cougars baseball seasons
Washington State Cougars baseball
College World Series seasons
Washington State
Pac-12 Conference baseball champion seasons